Helichrysum paulayanum is a species of flowering plant in the family Asteraceae.
It is found only in Yemen.

References

paulayanum
Endemic flora of Socotra
Least concern plants
Taxonomy articles created by Polbot